Thomas McKibbon (born October 29, 1939) is an American former rower. He competed in the men's double sculls event at the 1972 Summer Olympics.

References

External links
 

1939 births
Living people
American male rowers
Olympic rowers of the United States
Rowers at the 1972 Summer Olympics
Rowers from Detroit
Pan American Games medalists in rowing
Pan American Games bronze medalists for the United States
Rowers at the 1971 Pan American Games
World Rowing Championships medalists for the United States